Anan Yodsangwal (born 9 July 2001) is a Thai professional footballer who plays as a forward for Thai League 1 club Lamphun Warriors.

International career 
On 16 March 2022, Anan was called up to the Thailand U23 national team for the 2022 Dubai Cup U-23.

Honour 
 Lamphun Warriors
 Thai League 2 (1): 2021–22
 Thai League 3 (1): 2020–21

References

External links 
 

2001 births
Living people
Anan Yodsangwal
Anan Yodsangwal
Anan Yodsangwal
Association football forwards
Anan Yodsangwal
Anan Yodsangwal
Anan Yodsangwal